Kelmės Futbolo Klubas-VJSM, commonly known as Kelmės FK-VJSM, is a Lithuanian football club located in Kelmė, center of Kelmė District. During the 2015 and 2016 seasons in the I Lyga, the team was known as Kražantė. In 2019 season the club is playing in the II Lyga Western Zone.

History

The team was established in 2006 as VJSM Kelmė, VJSM being an abbreviation for Children and Youngsters Sports School. The team started in the 4th tier of the Lithuanian football.

In 2010, the team was renamed to "Kaslita" for sponsorship reasons. 

In 2011, the club qualified for the II Lyga, Western zone, the third tier of Lithuanian football. 

In the 2015 and 2016 seasons, VJSM Kelmė contested in the I Lyga. During this time, match fixing scandals took place and some players were disqualified from participating in any football activities. In 2017, the team lost sponsorship from the municipality of Kelmė and was relegated to the III Lyga.

In 2018, the team changed its name to Kelmės FK-VJSM and played in the III Lyga. The team finished the season in seventh place.  Gilbertas Kerpė and Deividas Nikolajevas scored three goals, making them the top scorers in the team. 

In 2019, the club applied for a license to participate in II Lyga, and was granted one. The team is playing in the Western Zone, which comprises 10 teams.

Confusion about the use of name "Kražantė"
 To the end of the 2006 season, there was another basketball and football club in Kelmė, named "Kražantė". This club was dissolved at the end of the 2006 season.
 At the beginning of the 2006 season, VJSM or Kelmės FK-VJSM was formed. This club used the name Kražantė between 2013 and 2017, but they remained a different entity from FK Kražantė Kelmė.

Historical names
 2006 – Kelmės VJSM
 2008 – Kelmės FK-VJSM
 2010 – Kelmės Kaslita
 2013 – Kelmės Kražantė
 2018 – Kelmės FK-VJSM

Honors
In the 2015 and 2016 seasons, Kelmės FK-VJSM (in that period was known as Kražantė) played in the I Lyga and finished seasons at 13th position.

Colors 
Black, yellow, and green.

Kit changes

Recent seasons

Stadium
Kelmės FK-VJSM play their home matches in Kelmė Stadium. The current capacity of the stadium is 300 seats.

Current squad 
The list of squad members as of August 7, 2018.

Lukas Jurgėlas
 Arūnas Korsakas
 Tomas Januška
 Lukas Jakštas
 Modestas Bučas
 Modestas Gedminas
 Kornelijus Petrauskas
 Ignas Dauskurdis
 Aurimas Černakauskas
 Dominykas Petrauskas
 Edgaras Jasiulaitis
 Gilbertas Kerpė
 Deividas Nikolajevas

References

External links
 lietuvosfutbolas.lt
 futbolinis.lt
 SAFF.lt

Football clubs in Lithuania
Association football clubs established in 2006